The PocketDelta Robot is a microrobot based on a parallel structure called "Delta robot". It has been designed to perform micro-assembly tasks where high-speed and high-precision are needed in a reduced working space. The robot's size is 120×120×200 mm offering a workspace diameter up to 150mm × 30mm.

Design
Prerequisites to high-speed and high-precision are a light, but stiff mechanical structure. Thus stiff and lightweight materials build up the moving part of the robot, whereas the heavy motors are attached to the supporting frame. The motors are attached directly to the robot arm (direct drive), eliminating backlash, friction and elasticity.

A high-level of integration reduces the size of the whole system. The mechanics, motion drives, control electronics and computing are all integrated into one compact unit. This innovative configuration simplifies its use and increases the flexibility of the robot.

The controller is based on PC architecture with interface boards for communication with the robot hardware. The realtime software enables the generation of trajectories in the Cartesian space using a direct and inverse kinematics model of the robot.

The robot integrates a web server which enables an easy communication through an Ethernet network using HTTP, TCP or UDP protocol.

History

 2004: The first prototype is developed at the microRobotics Lab of the Bern University of Applied Sciences in Biel (CH) as a part of a new project on "Microfactory"'s topic launched by the CSEM SA (CH) in collaboration with the EPFL (CH)
 2005: CSEM SA develops a new version of the robot and introduces it as the "world's smallest Delta robot"
 March 2007: CSEM's «Smallest Format Factory» and PocketDelta robot win the Swiss Technology Award and are nominated for the Hermes Award
 2007: The company Asyril SA  was founded as a spin-off company from CSEM. The company developed the current version of the PocketDelta robot together with its sister company CPAutomation SA and has been commercializing the robot as a tool for highly precise micro-mechanical manipulation as well as flexible part feeding systems.

Applications
Typical application's domains for the PocketDelta robot are the following:
 Watch and precision mechanics
 Assembly of medical devices
 Surface mount technology, semiconductor and electronic parts assembly
 MEMS and MOEMS
 System in package (SIP)
 Biochips

References

External links
Companies and universities
 Asyril SA (CH)
 CPAutomation SA (CH)
 CSEM SA (CH)
 Bern University of Applied Sciences (CH)
 EPFL (CH)
Videos
 PocketDelta robots integrated in a "Microfactory"
 PocketDelta robot playing at "Solitaire game"
Publications and articles
 http://mechse.uiuc.edu/portals/courses/ME598/dk/IWMF2006/data/PDF/P3-5.pdf
 http://www.ch-innovation.ch/smartobjectDatei/ACF166B.pdf
__notoc__

Micro robots
Robots of Switzerland
2004 robots
Delta robots